Čečovice is a municipality and village in Plzeň-South District in the Plzeň Region of the Czech Republic. It has about 90 inhabitants.

History
The first written mention of Čečovice is from 1355.

From 1 January 2021, Čečovice is no longer a part of Domažlice District and belongs to Plzeň-South District.

References

Villages in Plzeň-South District